Tymetrius Montovia Toney (born November 27, 1994) is an American professional basketball player who plays for Sporting CP.

Before leaving United States, Ty played for Eastern Michigan Eagles.

References

1994 births
Living people
American men's basketball players
Sporting CP basketball players
Point guards
People from Alpharetta, Georgia
Basketball players from Georgia (U.S. state)
American expatriate basketball people in Portugal